The Thomas Dawson House, in Trigg County, Kentucky about  south of Cadiz, was built in 1816–17.  It was listed on the National Register of Historic Places in 1980.

It is a one-and-a-half-story hall-parlor plan brick house, under renovation in 1980.

References

National Register of Historic Places in Trigg County, Kentucky
Houses completed in 1816